Chifunabuli District is a district of Luapula Province, Zambia. It was created in 2018 by splitting Samfya District.

References 

Districts of Luapula Province